The San Juan tuco-tuco (Ctenomys johannis) is a species of rodent in the family Ctenomyidae. It is endemic to west central Argentina, where it is known only from southern San Juan Province.

References

Mammals of Argentina
Tuco-tucos
Endemic fauna of Argentina
Mammals described in 1921
Taxa named by Oldfield Thomas